Bulbophyllum praetervisum is a species of orchid in the genus Bulbophyllum. It grows a single flower on each inflorescence, these flowers are glossy, thick, and fleshy. They exude a spicy fragrance.

References
The Bulbophyllum-Checklist
The Internet Orchid Species Photo Encyclopedia

praetervisum